Giovanni Bellini (c. 1430 – 26 November 1516) was a Venetian Renaissance painter, probably the best known of the Bellini family of Venetian painters. His father was Jacopo Bellini, his brother was Gentile Bellini (who was more highly regarded than Giovanni during his lifetime, although the reverse is true today), and his brother-in-law was Andrea Mantegna. He was considered to have revolutionized Venetian painting, moving it towards a more sensuous and colouristic style. Through the use of clear, slow-drying oil paints, Giovanni created deep, rich tints and detailed shadings. His sumptuous coloring and fluent, atmospheric landscapes had a great effect on the Venetian painting school, especially on his pupils Giorgione and Titian.

List

Early (1450–1465) 
 Madonna and Child (1450–1460) – Tempera on wood, 47 x 31.5 cm, Civico Museo Malaspina, Pavia
 Dead Christ Supported by the Madonna and St. John (1455) – Tempera on wood, 52 x 42 cm, Accademia Carrara, Bergamo
 Crucifixion (c. 1455–1460) – Tempera on wood, 54.5 x 30 cm, Museo Correr, Venice
 Transfiguration (c. 1455–1460) – Tempera on panel, 134 x 68 cm, Museo Correr, Venice
 The Dead Christ Supported by the Virgin Mary and St John the Evangelist (1460) – Tempera on panel, 86 x 107 cm, Pinacoteca di Brera, Milan
 Dead Christ Supported by Two Angels (Pietà, c. 1460) – Tempera on panel, 74 x 50 cm, Museo Correr, Venice
 Pietà (c. 1460) – Tempera on panel, 48 x 38 cm, Museo Poldi Pezzoli, Milan
 Blessing Christ (c. 1460) – Tempera on wood, 58 x 44 cm, Musée du Louvre, Paris
 The Blood of the Redeemer (c. 1460) – Tempera on panel, 134 x 68 cm, National Gallery, London 
 Madonna and Child (1460–1465) – Tempera on panel, 78 x 54 cm, Civiche Raccolte d'Arte, Milan
 Madonna and Child Blessing (1460–1464) – Tempera on wood, 79 x 63 cm, Gallerie dell'Accademia, Venice
 Madonna and Child (Greek Madonna, 1460–1464) – Tempera on wood, 82 x 62 cm, Pinacoteca di Brera, Milan
 Madonna and Child (Frizzoni Madonna) (1460–1464) – Oil on canvas transferred from wood, 52 x 42.5 cm, Museo Correr, Venice
 Presentation at the Temple (1460–1464) – Tempera on wood, 80 x 105 cm, Galleria Querini Stampalia, Venice
Virgin and Child (early 1460s) – Tempera and oil on panel, 64.5 x 44.1 cm, Philadelphia Museum of Art
 The Head of St John the Baptist (1464–1468) – Tempera on wood, diameter 28 cm, Musei Civici, Pesaro
 Polyptych of S. Vincenzo Ferreri (1464–1468) – Tempera on panel, Basilica dei Santi Giovanni e Paolo, Venice
 Agony in the Garden (c. 1465) – Tempera on wood, 81 x 127 cm, National Gallery, London
 Dead Christ Supported by Two Angels (c. 1465–1470) – Tempera on wood, 83 x 68 cm, Gemäldegalerie, Berlin

Maturity (1465–1505) 
 Madonna and Child (Lehman Madonna) (c. 1470) – Tempera on panel, 72 x 46 cm, Metropolitan Museum of Art, New York
 Pesaro Altarpiece (c.1471-c.1483) - Oil on panel, 262 x 240 cm, Musei Civici, Pesaro
 Pietà (1472) – Tempera on canvas, 115 x 317 cm, Doge's Palace, Venice
 Portrait of Georg Fugger (1474) – Tempera on panel, 26 x 20 cm, Norton Simon Museum, Pasadena, California
 Dead Christ Supported by Angels (c. 1474) – Tempera on panel, 91 x 131 cm, Pinacoteca Comunale, Rimini
 Madonna and Child (Lochis Madonna) (1475) – Tempera on panel, 47 x 34 cm, Accademia Carrara, Bergamo
 Enthroned Madonna Adoring the Sleeping Christ Child (1475) – Tempera on wood, 120 x 65 cm, Gallerie dell'Accademia, Venice
 Madonna and Child (c. 1475) – Tempera on panel, 77 x 57 cm, Museo di Castelvecchio, Verona
 Madonna and Child (c. 1475) – Tempera on panel, 75 x 50 cm, Santa Maria dell'Orto, Venice
 Madonna Adoring the Sleeping Christ Child (c. 1475) – Tempera on panel, 77 x 56 cm, Contini Bonacossi Collection, Florence
 Madonna and Child (1475–1480) – Oil on panel, 78 x 56 cm, Gallerie dell'Accademia, Venice
 Portrait of a Humanist (1475–1480) – Oil on panel, 35 x 28 cm, Civiche Raccolte d'Arte, Milan
 Resurrection of Christ (1475–1479) – Oil on panel, 148 x 128 cm, Staatliche Museen, Berlin
 St. Francis in Ecstasy  (c.1480) – Oil on panel, 124 x 142 cm, Frick Collection, New York, United States
 St. Jerome in the Desert (c. 1480) – Oil on panel, 145x 114 cm, Uffizi Gallery, Florence, Italy
 Transfiguration of Christ (c. 1480) – Oil on panel, 116 x 154 cm, Museo di Capodimonte, Naples
 St. Jerome Reading in the Countryside (1480–1485) – Oil on wood, 47 x 34 cm, National Gallery, London
 Willys Madonna (1480–1490) – Oil on panel, 75 x 59 cm, São Paulo Museum of Art, São Paulo, Brazil
 Madonna and Child (Alzano Madonna; c. 1485) – Oil on panel, 83 x 66 cm, Accademia Carrara, Bergamo
 Madonna of Red Angels (c. 1485) – Oil on panel, 77 x 60 cm, Gallerie dell'Accademia, Venice
 Portrait of a Condottiero – Oil on wood, 51 x 37 cm, National Gallery of Art, Washington
 Portrait of a Young Man in Red (1485–1490) – Oil on panel, 32 x 26 cm, National Gallery of Art, Washington
 Madonna of the Small Trees (1487) – Oil on panel, 74 x 58 cm, Gallerie dell'Accademia, Venice
 Madonna and Child (1485–1490) – Oil on panel, 88.9 x 71.1 cm, Metropolitan Museum of Art, New York
 San Giobbe Altarpiece (c. 1487) – Oil on panel, 471 x 258 cm, Gallerie dell'Accademia, Venice
 Madonna and Child with Saint Peter and Saint Sebastian (c. 1487) – Oil on panel, 84 x 61 cm, Musée du Louvre, Paris
 Frari Triptych (1488) – Oil on panel, Santa Maria Gloriosa dei Frari, Venice
 Barbarigo Altarpiece (1488) – Oil on canvas, 200 x 320 cm, San Pietro Martire, Murano
 Madonna and Child with Saint Mary Magdalene and Saint Ursula, also named Sacred Conversation, (1490) – Oil on panel, 77 x 104 cm, Museo del Prado, Madrid
 Allegories (c. 1490) – Gallerie dell'Accademia, Venice
 Madonna and Child with Saint Catherine and Saint Mary Magdalene, also named Sacred Conversation, (c. 1490) – Oil on wood, 58 x 107 cm, Gallerie dell'Accademia, Venice
 Holy Allegory (c. 1490) – Oil on panel, 73 x 199 cm, Uffizi, Florence
 Madonna and Child with the Infant St. John the Baptist  (1490–1495) – Oil on canvas, 76.2×58.4 cm, Indianapolis Museum of Art
 Madonna and Child with the infant St John the Baptist and St Joseph (c. 1490) – Oil on panel, private collection, Bergamo
 Portrait of a Gentleman (1490–1500) – Oil on wood, 31×26 cm, Uffizi, Florence
 The Lamentation over the Body of Christ  (c. 1500) – Tempera on wood, 76 x 121 cm, Uffizi, Florence
 Annunciation (Gabriel and Mary) (c. 1500) – Oil on canvas, 224 x 105 cm (each), Gallerie dell'Accademia, Venice
 Portrait of a Young Man (c. 1500) – Oil on panel, 32 x 26 cm, Musée du Louvre, Paris
 Portrait of a Young Man (c. 1500) – Oil on wood, 31 x 25 cm, National Gallery of Art, Washington
 Portrait of a Young Senator (1500) – Oil on wood, 31 x 26 cm, Uffizi, Florence
 Portrait of Doge Leonardo Loredan (1501) – Oil on panel, 61.5 x 45 cm, National Gallery, London
 Baptism of Christ (1500–1502) – Oil on canvas, 400 x 263 cm, Santa Corona, Vicenza
 Head of the Redeemer (1500–1502) – Oil on panel, 33 x 22 cm, Gallerie dell'Accademia, Venice
 Madonna and Child with St. John the Baptist and a Female Saint (1500–1504) – Oil on panel, 54 x 76 cm, Gallerie dell'Accademia, Venice
 Crucifixion (1501–1503) – Oil on panel, 81 x 49 cm, The Albert Gallery, Prato
The saviour (c. 1502) - Oil on panel, 44 x 33 cm, Royal Academy of San Fernando, Madrid.
 Sermon of St. Mark in Alexandria (1504–1507) – mostly painted by brother Gentile; Giovanni completed it upon his brothers death; Oil on canvas, 347 x 770 cm, Pinacoteca di Brera, Milan

Final phase (1505–1516) 
 St. Jerome in the Desert (possibly 1505 although some experts date it to 1480s.) – Oil on canvas, 49x 39 cm, National Gallery of Art, Washington
 Lamentation over the Dead Christ (c.1505) – Tempera on panel, 74 x 118 cm, Uffizi Gallery, Florence
 Sacred Conversation (1505–1510) – Oil on panel, 62 x 83 cm, Thyssen-Bornemisza Museum, Madrid
 San Zaccaria Altarpiece (1505) – Oil on canvas transferred from wood, 402 x 273 cm, San Zaccaria, Venice
 Madonna of the Meadow (Madonna del Prato; 1505) – Oil on canvas transferred from wood, 67 x 86 cm, National Gallery, London
 Pietà (Martinengo Pietà; 1505) – Oil on wood, 65 x 90 cm, Gallerie dell'Accademia, Venice
 The Assassination of Saint Peter Martyr (1507) – Egg tempera and oil on wood, 99.7 x 165.1 cm, National Gallery, London
 Madonna and Child with Four Saints and Donor (1507) – Oil on wood, 90 x 145 cm, San Francesco della Vigna, Venice
 Continence of Scipio (1507–1508) – Oil on canvas, 74.8 x 35.6 cm, National Gallery of Art, Washington
The Murder of St. Peter the Martyr (1509) – Oil on panel, 67.3 x 100.4 cm, Courtauld Institute Galleries, London
 Madonna and Child (1509) – Oil on panel, 80 x 106 cm, Detroit Institute of Art
 Madonna and Child (1510) – Oil on wood, 85 x 118 cm, Pinacoteca di Brera, Milan
 Madonna and Child (c. 1510) – Oil on wood, 50 x 41 cm, Galleria Borghese, Rome
 Saints Christopher, Jerome and Louis of Toulouse (1513) – Oil on panel, 300 x 185 cm, S. Giovanni Crisostomo, Venice
 Feast of the Gods (1514) – Oil on cavas, 170 x 188 cm, National Gallery of Art, Washington 
 Young Bacchus (c. 1514) – Oil on wood, 48 x 37 cm, National Gallery of Art, Washington
 Naked Young Woman in Front of the Mirror (1515) – Oil on canvas, 62 x 79 cm, Kunsthistorisches Museum, Vienna
 Portrait of Teodoro of Urbino (1515) – Oil on canvas, 63 x 49.5 cm, National Gallery, London
 Deposition (c. 1515) – Oil on canvas, 444 x 312 cm, Gallerie dell'Accademia, Venice
 Drunkenness of Noah (c. 1515) – Oil on canvas, 103 x 157 cm, Musée des Beaux-Arts, Besançon
 Madonna and Child with Donor (1502 until 1507) – Oil on canvas, National Museum of Poznań

Gallery

References 

 
Bellini, Giovanni